Edward Ernest "Judge" Reinhold Jr. (born May 21, 1957) is an American actor who has starred in several Hollywood movies, such as Ruthless People, Fast Times at Ridgemont High, Stripes and Gremlins, and co-starred in all of the films in the Beverly Hills Cop and The Santa Clause franchises.

Early life
Reinhold was born in Wilmington, Delaware, the son of Regina Celeste ( Fleming; born 1923) and Edward Ernest Reinhold (1907–1977), a trial lawyer. He was raised in Fredericksburg, Virginia and attended Alexis I. duPont High School until his family moved to Martin County, Florida prior to his junior year in high school. He attended Mary Washington College and Palm Beach Community College. His maternal grandfather was from County Meath, Ireland.

Career
Reinhold has appeared in more than 60 films.

Early roles
His first appearance on screen was in the Wonder Woman episode "Amazon Hot Wax" (1979), in which he played Jeff Gordon, a singer who gets caught up in an extortion ring in the music business. 

He had a lead role in the movie Running Scared (1980) and a supporting part in the comedy Stripes (1981), which was a big hit. He was one of many names in the flop comedy Pandemonium (1982).

Reinhold's first major film role was as high school senior Brad Hamilton in Fast Times at Ridgemont High (1982), along with then-unknown actors Sean Penn, Phoebe Cates, Forest Whitaker, Jennifer Jason Leigh, and Nicolas Cage. "I thought my career would really take off after that role," Reinhold said later. "Instead, Sean's career took off."

Reinhold had small roles in The Lords of Discipline (1983) and Gremlins (1984), and he appeared in an uncredited role in Pat Benatar's music video for "Shadows of the Night".

Beverly Hills Cop and stardom
Reinhold's career began to gain momentum when he played Detective Billy Rosewood, the junior police detective sent to trail Eddie Murphy's character, in Beverly Hills Cop (1984).

The film's success led to Reinhold being given starring roles in Roadhouse 66 (1985), Head Office (1985) and Off Beat, but none of those were particularly successful. However, Ruthless People (1986), where he had a supporting role, was a big hit. That year, he said in an interview, "In my movies I portray this 'Everyman' persona, someone everybody can empathize with. People can identify with a guy like me."

Reinhold tried to get financing for a film based on Carl Hiaasen's best-selling novel Tourist Season, but it was never made. Instead, he appeared in Beverly Hills Cop II (1987), which was another large success.

Reinhold was given the lead in Vice Versa (1988). Vice Versa flopped. "That was really the end of my highfalutin Hollywood career," Reinhold said later. "That's when the phone stopped ringing." He also developed a reputation for being difficult on set. "I was spoiled, and I was arrogant," said Reinhold of this period later. "I was very demanding, had an overblown image of who I was and got a reputation for being difficult. And rightfully so."

Return to supporting roles
He had supporting roles in Rosalie Goes Shopping (1989) and Daddy's Dyin': Who's Got the Will? (1990) and the lead in Enid Is Sleeping (1991) and Zandalee (1991).

Reinhold starred in the Canadian hard rock band Harem Scarem's 1992 music video "Honestly" as the male love interest. In 1994, Reinhold appeared in Beverly Hills Cop III and The Santa Clause. He reprised the latter role of Dr. Neal Miller in The Santa Clause 2 (2002) and The Santa Clause 3: The Escape Clause (2006).

Later career
Reinhold was nominated for an Emmy for a role on Seinfeld in which he played the "close talker" who develops an obsession with Jerry's parents. He can also be seen in Steven Spielberg's epic miniseries Into the West and replaced Charles Grodin in two direct-to-video movies in the Beethoven film series.

Reinhold appeared in the 2008 political satire Swing Vote. 

In September 2022, it was confirmed Reinhold would reprise his role as Detective Billy Rosewood in the upcoming Beverly Hills Cop: Axel Foley.

Personal life 
Reinhold was nicknamed "Judge" because, when he was a baby, he looked stern and judge-like.

He is a Christian.

Reinhold was arrested at Dallas Love Field airport on December 8, 2016, for disorderly conduct after objecting to a patdown from security shortly after he was released from the hospital following an adverse reaction to a medication. He spent ten hours in jail and accepted a deferred adjudication agreement under which charges would be dismissed in 90 days.

In popular culture
Reinhold has occasionally been referred to in film and television, largely in reference to his first name, Judge. The earliest example was Clerks: The Animated Series, where Reinhold voiced a judge called Judge Reinhold. In the Becker episode "Trials and Defibrillations", the presiding judge is called Judge (Miriam) Reinhold.

In Arrested Development, Reinhold, playing himself, appears as the judge of a fictional court show, a parody of such series as The People's Court, Judge Judy and Judge Mathis. In the film Fanboys, Billy Dee Williams appears as a courtroom judge named "Judge Reinhold".

Reinhold stars as the ex-boyfriend, terrorized by a jilted lover, in Jo-El Sonnier's 1988 music video for "Tear Stained Letter".

In The Simpsons episode "Lady Bouvier's Lover", when Marge found out that her mother was going to marry Mr. Burns, she told her that she couldn't because Burns was evil and tried to sway her toward getting together with Abraham Simpson. Jacqueline countered by saying that Abe was "an old fusspot". Marge then conceded that Grampa had his problems, but compared to Mr. Burns he was "Judge-freaking-Reinhold!" The comparison was lost on Jacqueline, however, as she didn't know who Reinhold was. Reinhold being a character actor who generally plays roles that call for an "awkward nice guy" demeanour, explains Marge's being one of his fans and having a favourable opinion of him, particularly by comparison to Mr. Burns.

Filmography

Awards and nominations

References

External links
 
 Judge Reinhold (Aveleyman)

1957 births
20th-century American male actors
21st-century American male actors
American male film actors
American male television actors
American male voice actors
Living people
Male actors from Delaware
Male actors from Florida
Male actors from Virginia
Male actors from Wilmington, Delaware
People from Fredericksburg, Virginia
People from West Palm Beach, Florida
University of Mary Washington alumni
University of North Carolina School of the Arts alumni
Palm Beach State College alumni
American people of Irish descent